Walhonding is an unincorporated community and coal town in southeastern Valley Township, Guernsey County, Ohio, United States.

Walhonding was a former mining community and home to two mine shafts known as walhonding mine no. 1 and walhonding mine no.2. Today little remains reflecting this history besides a large slate pile and a few abandoned mining homes. The roads in this area reflect the names of former residents many of which were of Czech and Slovak ancestry.

References

Unincorporated communities in Guernsey County, Ohio
Coal towns in Ohio
Unincorporated communities in Ohio